Chascanopsetta is a genus of flatfish in the family Bothidae (lefteye flounders) found in deeper parts of the Pacific and Indian Oceans with a single species, C. lugubris also occurring in the Atlantic Ocean. It contains nine member species.

Description
Members of this genus have an elongate body and a relatively large mouth, the latter giving rise to the common name pelican flounder (primarily used for P. lugubris). They lack rostral, orbital, or mandibular spines.

Species
There are currently ten recognized species in this genus:
 Chascanopsetta crumenalis (C. H. Gilbert & Cramer, 1897)
 Chascanopsetta elski Foroshchuk, 1991
 Chascanopsetta danae Bruun, 1937
 Chascanopsetta kenyaensis Hensley & Smale, 1997
 Chascanopsetta lugubris Alcock, 1894 (Pelican flounder)
 Chascanopsetta novaeguineae Tongboonkua, Lee & Chen, 2018
 Chascanopsetta megagnatha Amaoka & Parin, 1990
 Chascanopsetta micrognatha Amaoka & Yamamoto, 1984
 Chascanopsetta prognatha Norman, 1939
 Chascanopsetta prorigera (C. H. Gilbert, 1905)

References

Bothidae
Marine fish genera
Taxa named by Alfred William Alcock